The sixth series of British talent competition programme Britain's Got Talent was broadcast on ITV, from 24 March to 12 May 2012. The sixth series saw Simon Cowell resume a full commitment to the programme following the previous series, yet neither David Hasselhoff and Michael McIntyre returned to take part in the new series, leading to them being replaced by Alesha Dixon and David Walliams. Because of her pregnancy during filming of the auditions, Amanda Holden was required to miss a number of sessions, leading to producers asking Carmen Electra to step in as a guest judge in her place.

The sixth series of the programme saw a full commitment of incorporating a panel of four judges throughout every stage of the competition. The prize money offered by Britain's Got Talent was increased to £500,000 for this series only, the highest amount offered in the programme's history. In addition, the format of the programme saw a number of changes, including nine semi-finalists in each semi-final, the establishment of a Wildcard format similar to that used in America's Got Talent - in which the judges could appoint a single place in the final to any eliminated semi-finalist they favoured the most - and the incorporation of a mobile voting app, which functioned differently to the system used on The X Factor.

The sixth series was won by dancing dog act Ashleigh and Pudsey and finishing in first place and opera duo Jonathan and Charlotte finishing in second place; both final two along with many of the semi-finalists that took part in the competition were considered some of the best in the programme's history by 2012. During its broadcast, the series averaged around 10.6 million viewers. The programme faced controversy concerning two auditions and a mishap with the new voting system, of which Ofcom had to investigate ITV's handling in regards to two of these incidents that viewers raised complaints against.

Series overview

Following open auditions held the previous year, the Judges' auditions were held during January and February 2012, within Manchester, Blackpool, Cardiff, London, Edinburgh and Birmingham. Like the previous series, a number of acts were invited to audition between 6 and 22 January, after being found via their videos on YouTube. Twenty-five participants from this were picked by the producers and revealed by Britain's Got More Talent host Stephen Mulhern via a live YouTube stream from backstage at the London auditions, in which the YouTube community voted on their favourites between 6 and 13 February, with the winning acts later performing before the judges after the results of the vote on 18 February. Between 25 and 31 January, the sponsors of the show for this series, Virgin Media, ran addition auditions for the show via videos made on YouTube and/or Vimeo, which, while adhering to the same rules, were restricted to only Virgin Media customer, with the five winning acts later performing for the judges during the Birmingham auditions.

Following the previous series, both David Hasselhoff and Michael McIntyre announced that they wouldn't be returning for another year of the competition. Their decision led to the producers seeking out their replacements, after deciding to maintain the use of four judges in the programme following Cowell's announcement in December 2011 that he would be returning to oversee auditions for the sixth series. Both Hasselhoff and McIntyre were eventually replaced by comedian David Walliams, and singer and TV presenter Alesha Dixon, the latter having previously been a judge on BBC's Strictly Come Dancing. Owing to her pregnancy entering its late stages, Holden was forced to be absent from the Blackpool auditions. As a result, the production team brought in Carmen Electra as a guest judge and oversee these in her place, until Holden was cleared by doctors to return to overseeing the remainder of the auditions. Apart from a change in the judging panel, the producers decided to increase the prize money offered to the winner of the series to £500,000, with Cowell pledging half of the prize money being offered to the winner.

Of the participants that took part, only forty five made it past this stage and into the five live semi-finals, with nine appearing in each one; this was a significant change after the last four series of the programme. In a change with the format, the live final featured ten acts that made it through the semi-finals, and one additional act dubbed "the Judges' wildcard" - if a semi-finalist was eliminated in their semi-final, they became eligible to be picked as a wildcard act for the final by the judges, with the choice made prior to the live final's broadcast. The wildcard for this series was boyband The Mend, after they lost out in the tied Judges' vote in the first semi-final. The following below lists the results of each participant's overall performance in this series:

 |  | 
 |  Judges' Wildcard Finalist

  Ages denoted for a participant(s), pertain to their final performance for this series.
  Due to the nature of Aquabatique's performance, their live round performances had to be performed outside of the studio, with the judges and studio audience watching via screens.
  The latter value pertains to the age of the dog, as disclosed by its owner.

Semi-finals summary
 Buzzed out |  Judges' vote | 
 |  |

Semi-final 1 (6 May)
Guest Performer, Results Show: Tulisa

  The Mend were later sent through to the final as the judges' wildcard.

Semi-final 2 (7 May)
Guest Performers, Result Show: The Wanted

Semi-final 3 (8 May)
Guest Performers, Results Show: LMFAO

Semi-final 4 (9 May)
Guest Performers, Results Show: Labrinth

Semi-final 5 (10 May)
Guest Performer, Results Show: Rebecca Ferguson

Final (12 May)
Guest Performers, Results Show: Susan Boyle, Diversity & Paul Gbegbaje, and The Show Bears (featuring David Walliams)

 |

Ratings

Criticism, controversies & incidents

Beatrix Von Bourbon audition
On 23 April 2012, Ofcom launched an investigation into the programme after receiving complaints from viewers regarding the audition of burlesque performer Beatrix Von Bourbon. The complaints focused on the nature of her performance - which her stripping down until she wore only nipple tassels and a corset - and thus its suitability for a family audience and being aired before the 9pm watershed. The investigation lasted two months, and concluded on 23 July with the regulator ruling that ITV had not breached its broadcasting codes on protecting children from unsuitable material, stating that the broadcaster's measures to censor the footage of the audition had been within acceptable parameters.

Ryan O'Shaughnessy audition
Researchers for Britain's Got Talent were forced to inform production staff that the participation of Ryan O'Shaughnessy, who auditioned for the sixth series, was heavily controversial due to his failure to disclose information in his application form for the show. Per the programme's terms and conditions, O'Shaughnessy had not disclosed that his involvement would be ineligible, due to him signing a contract with Universal Music and securing a place on the first series of The Voice of Ireland that same year. Although the singer was confronted with this information and stated in his defence that he wished to express his own music, Simon Cowell had to make clear that his involvement on the programme was a direct conflict of interest. O'Shaughnessy was only able to continue his participation after dropping out of The Voice of Ireland and his contract with Universal Music before his semi-final appearance.

Voting app mishap
Although voting prior to the sixth series had been mainly conducted via phone votes, production staff decided to incorporate a second method of voting for viewers, in the form of a mobile app. The concept was that viewers could use the app to purchase a set of three votes for a small fee and use for any act within the semi-finals - if a viewers used two mobile votes in one semi-final, the third could be used in another, with viewers able to buy more votes after using up their initial set. However, the implementation of this voting method for the first semi-final saw technical difficulties arise, which could not be fixed and led to the app being discontinued for the rest of the series. Ofcom was forced to investigate the incident after viewers complained about the difficulty of making votes with the app. Although the regulator reprimanded ITV for the failures in the operation of the app, it acknowledged that the concept was an original idea and that the broadcaster was not at fault for the technical issues that occurred per the actions taken to deal with the resulting problems.

References

2012 British television seasons
Britain's Got Talent